After Martin Luther King Jr. was assassinated on April 4, 1968, thousands of U.S. troops stationed at Fort Hood in Killeen, Texas, were sent to Chicago for riot control duty. Several black civilians were killed. 

In mid-August 1968, another large group of soldiers stationed at Fort Hood was scheduled to return to Chicago in late August to control potential rioters at the Democratic National Convention. At midnight on Friday, August 23, sixty African American troops staged a nonviolent sit-in on base to protest their deployment to Chicago. The majority of these soldiers were uncomfortable with being placed in situation where they might be asked to police other black Americans. Several of the demonstrators said they had grown up in low-income neighborhoods and suggested that they could empathize with the folks in those areas who might feel riots were necessary. At 5 a.m. Saturday morning, the division commander and members of his staff met with the protesters and discussed their grievances. Seventeen of the demonstrators got up and left, but forty-three continued to protest. The protesters were placed in the Fort Hood stockade for failing to report for morning reveille.

The protesting soldiers became known as the “Fort Hood 43,” and their refusal to deploy to Chicago for riot-control duties was one of the largest acts of dissent in United States military history. Over the next few weeks and months, a number of the Fort Hood 43 were court-martialed and punished, receiving sentences of three to six months of hard labor, a forfeiture of a considerable portion of their wages and reductions of rank.

References 

1968 in Texas
Military history of the United States
43
Mutinies
1968 in Illinois
African-American history in Chicago
Bell County, Texas
Assassination of Martin Luther King Jr.
King assassination riots